The 2014 Cork Senior Hurling Championship is the 126th staging of the Cork Senior Hurling Championship since its establishment by the Cork County Board in 1887. The championship began on 20 April 2014 and ended on 12 October 2014.

Midleton were the defending champions, however, they were beaten by Douglas in round four. Courcey Rovers were relegated from the championship after three seasons in the top tier. Sarsfield's won the title after a 2–18 to 0–8 defeat of Glen Rovers in the final.

Team changes

To Championship

Promoted from the Cork Premier Intermediate Hurling Championship
 Youghal

From Championship

Relegated to the Cork Premier Intermediate Hurling Championship
 Ballinhassig

Fixtures and results

Divisions/Colleges

First round

Second round

Third round

Relegation play-off

Fourth round

Quarter-finals

Semi-finals

Final

Championship statistics

Scoring
First goal of the championship: Eamon Collins for Carrigdhoun against Duhallow (Divisions/Colleges first round, 20 April 2014)

Miscellaneous

 The championship decider between Sarsfield's and Glen Rovers was the last to be played at Páirc Uí Chaoimh before its redevelopment.
 Sarsfeild's win their fourth title in eight seasons.
 Youghal return to the senior championship for the first time since 1996.

Top scorers
Overall

Single game

External links
 Divisions and Colleges fixtures and results
 Club fixtures and results

References

Cork Senior Hurling Championship
Cork Senior Hurling Championship